Wang Chengyi (born July 17, 1983 in Xiangshan County, Zhejiang) is a female Chinese sports shooter who competed in the 2004 Summer Olympics.

She won the bronze medal in the women's 50 metre rifle three positions competition.

External links
 profile

1983 births
Living people
Chinese female sport shooters
ISSF rifle shooters
Olympic bronze medalists for China
Olympic shooters of China
Shooters at the 2004 Summer Olympics
Asian Games medalists in shooting
Olympic medalists in shooting
Sportspeople from Ningbo
Medalists at the 2004 Summer Olympics
Shooters at the 2006 Asian Games
Shooters at the 2010 Asian Games
Universiade medalists in shooting
Asian Games gold medalists for China
Asian Games silver medalists for China
Asian Games bronze medalists for China
Medalists at the 2006 Asian Games
Medalists at the 2010 Asian Games
Sport shooters from Zhejiang
Universiade gold medalists for China
Universiade silver medalists for China
Medalists at the 2011 Summer Universiade
People from Xiangshan County, Zhejiang